Conus parius, common name the Parian cone, is a species of sea snail, a marine gastropod mollusk in the family Conidae, the cone snails and their allies.

Like all species within the genus Conus, these snails are predatory and venomous. They are capable of "stinging" humans, therefore live ones should be handled carefully or not at all.

Description
The size of the shell varies between 25 mm and 46 mm. The color of the shell is white to pale yellowish, often longitudinally indistinctly marked with deeper coloring. The spire is striate. The lower part of the body whorl is distantly sulcate.

Conantokin-Pr1, -Pr2 and -Pr3 are toxins derived from the venom of Conus parius. These small neurotoxic peptides have been found to act as NMDA antagonists in vitro, and stimulate production of the transcription factor CREB in the brain.

Distribution
This marine species occurs off the Philippines and Indonesia; off Papua New Guinea, the Solomon Islands and Vanuatu

References

  J.B. Lamarck, Histoire naturelle des animaux sans vertèbres t. 11 Paris,Verdière,1845
 Tucker J.K. & Tenorio M.J. (2009) Systematic classification of Recent and fossil conoidean gastropods. Hackenheim: Conchbooks. 296 pp.
 Puillandre N., Duda T.F., Meyer C., Olivera B.M. & Bouchet P. (2015). One, four or 100 genera? A new classification of the cone snails. Journal of Molluscan Studies. 81: 1–23

External links
 The Conus Biodiversity website
 Cone Shells - Knights of the Sea
 

parius
Gastropods described in 1844